HMS Dido was an  wooden screw sloop built for the Royal Navy in 1869.  She was the fourth ship of the Royal Navy to bear the name.  She was reclassified in 1876 as a corvette, and in 1906 renamed Actaeon II.  She served as a mine depot ship and was merged into the Torpedo School at Sheerness, being sold for breaking in 1922.

Design

Designed by Edward Reed, the Royal Navy Director of Naval Construction, the hull was of wooden construction, with iron cross beams.  A ram bow was fitted.

Propulsion

Propulsion was provided by a two-cylinder horizontal single-expansion steam engine by Humphrys, Tennant & Company driving a single screw.

Sail Plan

All the ships of the class were built with a ship rig, but this was altered to a barque rig.

Armament

The Eclipse class was designed with two 7-inch (6½-ton) muzzle-loading rifled guns mounted in traversing slides and four 64-pounder muzzle-loading rifled guns. They were re-classified as corvettes in 1876, carrying 12 guns.

History

Launch and Commissioning

Dido was launched at Portsmouth Dockyard on 23 October 1869 and commissioned into the Royal Navy on 20 April 1871 for service on the West Coast of Africa, leaving England on 6 May.

West Africa Station (1871)

Dido called at Madeira, arriving at Sierra Leone on 9 June.  She relieved HMS Sirius at Fernando Po on 16 July. The Times of Thursday 8 June 1876 tells the story of her next adventure:

In December 1871 Dido arrived at Simonstown, where Captain Chapman was to act as the Senior Officer during the absence of the Commodore on the West Coast. Five months later, on 16 May 1872, she left the Cape for Sydney, having been ordered to join the Australian Station.

Australia Station (1872 - 1875)

On her way to Sydney Dido paused at St. Paul's, where the remains of Megaera were still to be seen. She arrived at Sydney on 3 July 1872, and then spent nine months in New Zealand, followed by a journey to Fiji in February 1873.  The islands of Fiji were in a state of chaos, with the relationship between the government of King Cakabau and the European settlers brought to crisis point by the murder of the Burns family.  The Times relates what happened:

After remaining in Fiji for six months she left for Sydney, pausing at the islands of the New Hebrides, Solomon, New Ireland, and Carolines to return kidnapped South Sea Islanders.  After a stay of six months in Sydney, where a new cylinder was made, the ship returned to Fiji in July 1874, having called at Norfolk Island on her way. On 17 July news arrived of the wreck of the French warship L'Hermite at Wallace Island, and Dido at once went to her assistance.  In September, Sir Hercules Robinson, the Governor of New South Wales, arrived in HMS Pearl to reopen negotiations for the cession of the islands. The ship took a prominent part in the ceremony which marked the final cession of Fiji to Great Britain on 10 October 1874, during which the ex-King presented the Fijian flag to Captain Chapman, when it was hauled down for the last time to make room for the Union Flag. Dido carried King Cakabau to Sydney to visit the Governor of New South Wales, and returned with him to Fiji a month later. Some sources ascribe to this visit the introduction of measles among the native population.  Having no immunity to the disease, large loss of life resulted. On 7 February 1875 she again left Fiji and, calling at New Caledonia, she sailed for Auckland.  After five months in and around New Zealand Dido returned to Sydney, where she learnt of the death of Commodore Goodenough from poisoned arrows in the Santa Cruz Islands. Captain Chapman received his appointment as Commodore by telegram from the Admiralty.

During her last days on the Australian Station Dido visited Tasmania, leaving Sydney on 2 December for Melbourne, where Commodore Chapman relinquished command of the station to Captain Hoskins.  HMS Sapphire arrived to relieve her, and she sailed for home.

Out of commission (1876 - 1879)

She recommissioned at Portsmouth on 27 May 1879, now as a 12-gun corvette, commanded by Captain Arthur Richard Wright.

West Africa Station and the First Boer War (1879 - 1881)

Dido served on the West Africa Station, where Captain Wright died in command on 19 August 1879. He was succeeded by Captain Compton Edward Domvile on 19 September 1879.

In 1881 Dido contributed 50 men and two field guns to a Naval Brigade, which went to the front under Lieutenant Henry Ogle. Dido lost 3 killed and 3 wounded at the Battle of Majuba Hill on 27 February.  Captain Compton Domvile went to the front to take charge of the Naval Brigade, but no further action took place before the end of the war on 23 March.

North America and West Indies Station (1881 - 1886)

The ship was re-assigned to the North America and West Indies Station, based at the Royal Naval Dockyard in Bermuda, in October 1881. In 1883, Dido as specially prepared to carry Princess Louise from Charleston, South Carolina, to winter in Bermuda, embarking the Princess at Charleston at 17:00 on the 24 January and arriving about noon on the 29 January at Grassy Bay (the anchorage of the Fleet in the Great Sound), from where the Princess was carried by HM Tender Supply to Hamilton Harbour, then rowed ashore to Front Street in the City of Hamilton where the Governor and military Commander-in-Chief of Bermuda, Lieutenant-General Thomas LJ Gallwey, waited. From there the ship was steamed to Barbados, to be paid off on 16 February 1883. The paid off crew returned to England, via Bermuda, aboard HMS Tamar. On recommissioning Captain Frederick Samuel Vander-Meulen commanded her on the station until 1886, when she returned home to Portsmouth.

Hulk (1886)

On 25 September 1886 Dido paid off at Portsmouth and her sea-going equipment was removed so that her hull could be used for accommodation and storage.  She served as a mine depot in the Firth of Forth, and in 1906 her name was changed to Actaeon II.  She became part of the Torpedo School at Sheerness.

Disposal
Actaeon II was sold to J B Garnham for breaking on 17 July 1922.

Commanding officers

References

Bibliography

 

 

Eclipse-class sloops
1869 ships
Victorian-era sloops of the United Kingdom
Victorian-era corvettes of the United Kingdom